Canyon is an extinct town in Whitman County, in the U.S. state of Washington.

A post office called Canyon was established in 1905, and remained in operation until 1918. The community was named for a canyon near the town site.

References

Ghost towns in Washington (state)
Geography of Whitman County, Washington